Descartes' theorem may refer to:

Descartes' theorem concerning four mutually tangent circles
Descartes' theorem on total angular defect
Descartes' rule of signs